Touchdown, Army retitled Generals of Tomorrow in the UK is a 1938 American comedy film directed by Kurt Neumann, written by Lloyd Corrigan and Erwin S. Gelsey, and starring John Howard, Mary Carlisle, Robert Cummings, William Frawley, Owen Davis Jr., and Benny Baker. It was released on October 7, 1938, by Paramount Pictures.

Plot
Army University football player Jimmy Howal gets a reception far different from what he expected when he enters West Point. His cocky attitude makes everyone opposed of him, especially hot-tempered southerner Brandon Culpepper, who also sees Howal as a rival for beautiful Toni Denby, daughter of West Point officer Colonel Denby. Howal is failing French prior to the Army-Navy game, and the cadets fear he will be kept from playing because of it. Then, Toni tutors Howal, but she, unknowingly, uses an old exam which is the basis for the new test. Howal realizes what has happened when he passes the exam with flying colors and suspects Toni of having set out to make a fool of him.

Cast 
John Howard as Cadet Brandon Culpepper
Mary Carlisle as Toni Denby
Robert Cummings as Cadet Jimmy Howal
William Frawley as Jack Heffernan
Owen Davis Jr. as Cadet Kirk Reynolds
Benny Baker as Cadet Dick Mycroft
Minor Watson as Col. Denby
Raymond Hatton as Bob Haskins

Production
Lew Ayres was meant to play a lead but Robert Cummings – who was already in the cast – took the part instead, promoted from a more subsidiary role. Filming started June 1938.

References

External links 
 

1938 films
1930s sports comedy films
American black-and-white films
American sports comedy films
American football films
Films directed by Kurt Neumann
Films scored by John Leipold
Films set in the United States Military Academy
Paramount Pictures films
1938 comedy films
1930s English-language films
1930s American films